The Magni M-18 Spartan is an Italian autogyro, that was designed and produced by Magni Gyro srl of Besnate. The aircraft was supplied as a kit for amateur construction or as a complete ready-to-fly-aircraft

While listed as in production in 2011, by 2013 the M-18 Spartan was no longer advertised by Magni Gyro as part of their product line.

Design and development
The M-18 was the smallest autogyro offered by the company. It features a single main rotor, a single-seat open cockpit with a windshield, tricycle landing gear with wheel pants and a twin cylinder, air-cooled, two-stroke, dual-ignition  Rotax 582 engine in pusher configuration.

The aircraft fuselage is made from TIG-welded 4130 steel tubing, while the cockpit fairing is fibreglass. The propeller is a three-bladed carbon fibre, ground adjustable type. The supplied fuel tank holds .

Specifications (M-18 Spartan)

References

2000s Italian sport aircraft
Single-engined pusher autogyros
Magni aircraft